The 2017 Men's PSA World Series Finals is the men's edition of the 2016 PSA World Series Finals (Prize money : $160 000). The top 8 players in the 2016–17 PSA World Series are qualified for the event. The event will take place in Dubai in the United Arab Emirates from 6 to 10 June 2017.

Seeds

Group stage results

Pool A

Pool B

Draw and results

See also
2017 Men's PSA World Series Finals
2016–17 PSA World Series
PSA World Series Finals
PSA World Tour 2016
2017 PSA World Tour

References

External links
PSA World Series website
World Series Final official website

PSA World Tour
M